Godivje is a village in Municipality of Krivogaštani.

Demographics
According to the 2002 census, the village had a total of 166 inhabitants. Ethnic groups in the village include:

Macedonians 165
Serbs 1

References

Villages in Krivogaštani Municipality